Verónica María Ravenna (born 19 February 1998) is an Argentine luger. She competed in the women's singles event at the 2018 Winter Olympics and the 2022 Winter Olympics.

Early life 
When she was six years old, she moved with her family to Vancouver, Canada.

Career 
She began her sport career when she was eleven years old, after learning about luge while visiting the Whistler Sliding Centre during a school visit. In 2014 she suffered a clavicle fracture, which prevented her from joining the Canadian youth team. The following year, she received an invitation from the Argentine Luge Federation to represent her birth country in the 2014-2015 world cup hosted in Oberhof, Germany.

She participated in the 2016 Winter Youth Olympics that took place in Lillehammer, Norway. She was the Flag bearer during the closing ceremony. She finished in the seventh place and won an Olympic diploma.

Then she competed in the 2017 FIL World Luge Championships hosted in Innsbruck, Austria, where she finished in 23rd place in the mayors category and the tenth place in Sub 23. She also took part in the 2016-2017 and 2017-2018 world cup editions where she finished in the 35th place and 58th place respectively. In 2018, he was ranked 25th in the youth world championship held in Altenberg, Germany.

Pyeongchang 2018 
She qualified for the 2018 Winter Olympics hosted in Pyeongchang, South Korea after a quota place was released. She competed for the first time in the women's singles event in Luge. Verónica was the second Argentine woman to compete in luge in an Olympic Games, after the participation of Michelle Despain in the 2006 Winter Olympics.

At 19 years old, she was the youngest of the Argentine delegation and the only one that competed in an ice sport. She finished in the 24th place, the same rank than her predecessor, Michelle Despain, achieved during the 2006 Winter Olympics in Turin, Italy.

Gallery

References

External links
 
 
 
 
 
 

1998 births
Living people
Argentine female lugers
Olympic lugers of Argentina
Lugers at the 2016 Winter Youth Olympics
Lugers at the 2018 Winter Olympics
Lugers at the 2022 Winter Olympics
Place of birth missing (living people)
Argentine emigrants to Canada